This is a list of women's organizations ordered by geography.

International

 Alliance of Pan American Round Tables – founded 1916 to foster women's relationships throughout the Americas
 Arab Feminist Union – founded 1945
 Associated Country Women of the World – international organisation formed in 1933
 Associations of Junior Leagues International – Women's development organization
 Beta Sigma Phi – founded 1931
 Communist Women's International (1920–30) – established to advance communist ideas among women
 Council of Women World Leaders – Membership of nearly all the world's current and former women presidents and prime ministers
 Ellevate Network – Global professional network dedicated to closing the gender achievement gap (founded 1997)
 Equality Now – founded in 1992 to ensure gender equality and an end to violence against women
 Every Woman Foundation – celebrating International Women's Day
 Graduate Women International – Organized to promote women's education (founded 1919)
 Inner Wheel Club – founded 1924 for the wives and daughters of Rotarians
 International Alliance of Women – founded in 1904 to advocate suffrage
 International Alliance for Women – founded 1980 for professional women
 International Association of Women Police – (established 1915) network for women in law enforcement and criminal justice
 International Council of Women – founded in the year 1888, first international women's organization
 International Federation for Research in Women's History – founded 1987, organizes international conferences
 International Federation of Business and Professional Women – founded 1930, network for professional women
International Federation of Women Lawyers – founded 1944, enhances the status of women and children by providing legal aid, legal literacy and education programs, and through advocacy, law reform, research and publications
 International Women's Forum – founded 1974
 International Women's Health Coalition – founded 1984, based in New York to advocate for issues pertaining to women's health, this foundation also helps bring to light severe issues such as the stigmatization of women's health
 International Women's Suffrage Alliance – major suffrage organization
 LeanIn.Org – founded in 2013, runs programs that counter gender stereotypes and advance opportunities for all women. Time's Up (movement)
 Little Entente of Women – umbrella organization for Eastern European women's groups
 National Association of Women in Construction – founded 1955 for the advancement of women in construction
 National Organization for Women – women's equal rights group
 National Women's Register – covers various countries and is a mother's day out program for stay-at-home caregivers
 Nobel Women's Initiative – founded by women Nobel Peace Prize winners
 One Billion Rising – founded 2012, against rape and beating
Organization for Women in Science for the Developing World
P.E.O. Sisterhood – philanthropic organization with chapters in North America (organized 1869)
 Quota International – empowering women, children, deaf, hard-of-hearing, and speech impaired (founded 1919)
 Peace X Peace – founded 2002
Relief Society – Worldwide charitable and educational organization of women in the Church of Jesus Christ of Latter-day Saints (founded 1842)
 St. Joan's International Alliance – Feminist Catholic organization founded in 1911
 Soroptimist International – Worldwide service-organisation for women (founded 1921)
 Socialist International Women – founded 1907
 Sweet Adelines International – founded 1945 for women's barbershop harmony singers
 The RINJ Foundation – civil society women's group focused on safety of women & children particularly from sexual exploitation & violence (founded 2012)
TimesUp – organisation all around the world (famous ambassadors: Emma Watson, Meryl Streep)
 UNIFEM – United Nations Development Fund for Women (established 1976)
 UN Women – established 2010
 United Methodist Women – founded in 1869
 Woman's Christian Temperance Union – Anti-alcohol movement (founded 1874)
 Womankind Worldwide – supporting women in Africa, Asia and Latin America
 Women Deliver – a global advocacy organization that works to generate political commitment and financial investment for fulfilling Millennium Development Goal 5 – reducing maternal mortality and achieving universal access to reproductive health.
 Women Without Borders – founded 2002, empowering women as agents of change
 Women for Women International – for women survivors of war
 Women in Animation – in support of women animators
 Women in Parliaments Global Forum – in support of women parliamentarians
 Women in the World Foundation
 Women's Commission For Refugee Women and Children – Seeks to defend rights of refugee women, youth and children (organized 1989)
 Women's Environment & Development Organization – Advocates women’s equality in global policy (created 1990)
 Women's International Democratic Federation – founded in 1945 in Paris, organization aimed at improving women's economic rights
 Women's International League for Peace and Freedom (WILPF) – Women's peace movement (created 1915)
 Women's International Zionist Organization – Founded in 1929 to provide community services in Mandate Palestine, now active in Israel and throughout the Jewish world
 Women's World Banking founded 1979, empowering low-income women around the world through financial inclusion
 Women's WorldWide Web (W4) – Empowering women and girls around the world (founded 2010)
 World Association of Girl Guides and Girl Scouts – founded 1928
 World Pulse – Women's Social Network to connect women globally (founded 2003)
 Young Women's Christian Association – Originally created to provide housing and other services to Christian women (founded 1855)
 Zonta International – founded 1919, a global organization of executives and professionals working together to advance the status of women worldwide through service and advocacy

Africa
ABANTU for Development – seeks to empower women in politics, economy, and development
African Women's Development Fund – founded 2001, supporting women's rights organizations
Akina Mama wa Afrika – founded 1985
Amal Women's Training Center and Moroccan Restaurant – helps disadvantaged women gain work experience by training them in the culinary arts
Association Solidarité Féminine – helps single mothers gain work experience by training them at the association's restaurant, patisserie, and hammam
FEMNET – founded 1988
Network for Locally Elected Women of Africa (REFELA) – founded 2011
Sande society – initiating girls into adulthood
Women'sNet – South African support for women activists using technology
WOUGNET – Women of Uganda Network

Angola
Organization of Angolan Women (OMA) – founded 1962

Burundi
National Women's Forum (FNF) – founded 2013

Democratic Republic of the Congo
Dynamique des femmes jurists – founded 2006
Nothing Without Women – founded 2015
Fifty Percent Women or Nothing Dynamic - founded 2019

Egypt
Egyptian Centre for Women's Rights – founded 1996
Egyptian Feminist Union – founded 1923
Mabarrat Muhammad 'Ali or Muhammad 'Ali Benevolent Society, (1909–1964)

Eswatini
Eswatini Single Mothers Organization (SWASMO) – founded 2009

Ethiopia
KMG Ethiopia – founded 1997

Ghana
Mbaasem Foundation, founded 2000 by Ama Ata Aidoo
National Council of Ghana Women (NCGW), 1960–1966
National Federation of Gold Coast Women (NFGCW), 1953–1960
Sirigu Women's Organisation for Pottery and Art (SWOPA), founded 1997

Ivory Coast
Association des Femmes Ivoiriennes – founded 1963

Kenya
Maendeleo Ya Wanawake – founded 1952, women / yahya's rights

Liberia
National Liberian Women's Social and Political Movement (NLWSPM), 1920 by Maude A. Morris
Liberian Women's Social and Political Movement, founded 1946 by Sarah Simpson-George

Libya
Voice of Libyan Women (VLW) – founded 2011

Mali
Association des Juristes Maliennes (AJM) – founded 1988

Mauritania
The Association of Women Heads of Households (AFCF) – founded 1999 by Aminetou Mint El-Moctar

Morocco
Amal Women's Training Center and Moroccan Restaurant – founded 2012
Democratic Association of Moroccan Women – founded 1985
Association Solidarité Féminine – founded 1985 by Aïcha Chenna
Miss Moto Maroc – founded 2011

Mozambique
 Organization of Mozambican Women – founded 1973

Namibia
Epako Women's Center – founded 2011
Namibia Women's Action for Equality Party – founded 1994
Sister Namibia – founded 1989

Nigeria
DeltaWomen – founded 2010
International Women's Society – founded 1957
National Association of Nigerian Prostitutes
National Centre for Women Development (NCWD) – founded 1997
National Commission for Women (NCW) – founded 1988
Rural Women Energy Security (RUWES) – founded 2013
Women in Management, Business and Public Service (WIMBIZ) – founded 2001
Women Consortium of Nigeria (WOCON) – founded 1993 by Bisi Olateru-Olagbegi
Women in Nigeria (WIN) – founded 1982
Women's Technology Empowerment Centre (W.TEC) – founded 2008

Republic of the Congo
African Women's Union of the Congo (UFAC)
Femmes-Caïmans – founded 1956

Rwanda
Pro-Femmes Twese Hamwe – founded 1992

Senegal
Henriette-Bathily Women's Museum – opened 1994
Yewwu-Yewwi – founded 1984

Sierra Leone
Sierra Leone Women's Movement (SLWM) – founded 1951 by Constance Cummings-John
National Congress of Sierra Leone Women (NCSLW) – founded 1960

Somalia
Abay Siti – founded 19th century
IIDA Women's Development Organisation – founded 1991
Puntland Women Lawyers Association
Sixth Clan – founded 2002 by Asha Haji Elmi
Somali Women's Democratic Organization – founded 1977

South Africa
African National Congress Women's League – founded 1948, replacing Bantu Women's League founded 1918 by Charlotte Maxeke
Natal Organisation of Women – founded 1983
National Movement of Rural Women (NMRW) – founded 1990
Women Forward – founded 2008
Women’s Enfranchisement Association of the Union – founded 1911

Uganda
Association of Uganda Professional Women in Agriculture and Environment
Eliezah Foundation Initiative Uganda – founded 2005
FEMRITE – women writers association, founded 1995
Uganda Women Parliamentary Association
Uganda Women's Network
Women At Work International – founded 2003
WOUGNET – founded 2000

Zambia
Zambia Alliance of Women – founded 1978
Zambian National Women's Lobby – founded 1991

Zimbabwe
Akashinga – founded 2017
Zimbabwe Women Writers – founded 1990
Zimbabwe Women's Bureau – founded 1978
Zimbabwe Women's Resource Centre and Network – founded 1990

Asia
 All-China Women's Federation (ACWF)
 Arab Feminist Union
 Honour for Women National Campaign – India
 OYSS Women
 Na'amat – Israel-based women's organization
 National Alliance of Taiwan Women's Associations (NATWA)
 WomensHub – Philippines support for women activists using technology

Afghanistan

Afghan Women's Business Federation – founded 2005
Afghan Women's Council – founded 1978
Afghan Women's Network – founded 1996
Anjuman-i Himayat-i-Niswan – founded 1928
Democratic Women's Organisation of Afghanistan – founded 1965
Kapisa Women's Center – founded 2008
Ministry of Women's Affairs (Afghanistan) – founded 2001
Women for Afghan Women – founded 2001
Women's Welfare Association – founded 1946
Young Women for Change – founded 2011

Bahrain
Supreme Council for Women – advisory body to the government

Bangladesh
Bangladesh Homeworkers Women Association
Bangladesh Mahila Parishad – founded 1970
Bangladesh Mahila Samiti
Bangladesh National Women Lawyers' Association

China
Tiananmen Mothers – founded 1989

East Timor
Rede Feto – established 2000, umbrella organization

India
All Bengal Women's Union, founded 1932
All India Federation of Women Lawyers
All India Women's Conference, founded 1927
Angami Women Organization
Association of Theologically Trained Women of India
Bharatiya Grameen Mahila Sangh (National Association of Rural Women India)
Bharatiya Muslim Mahila Andolan (Indian Muslim Women's Movement)
Bhumata Brigade 
Centre for Equality and Inclusion
Centre for Women's Development Studies
Confederation of Women Entrepreneurs
Friends of Women's World Banking
Gulabi Gang
Honour for Women National Campaign
Indian Women Scientists' Association
Mahila Atma Raksha Samiti, women's rights 
Ministry of Women and Child Development
Msf Haritha, founded 2012, empowering women
Nari Mukti Sangh founded 1990, women's liberation
Odanadi Seva Trust, founded 1984, trafficking
OYSS Women
Project Nanhi Kali, supporting girls' education
RAHI Foundation, incest and abuse support
Sabala Organization, women's empowerment
Sanlaap, women's rights
Self Employed Women's Association
Shri Mahila Griha Udyog Lijjat Papad, women's cooperative
Working Women's Forum, founded 1976, empowering poor women

Indonesia
Aisyiyah, founded 1917, women's empowerment
Gerakan Wanita Sosialis
Isteri-Sedar
Murba Women's Union
Wanita Indonesia
Working Women's Front

Iran
Jam'iyat-e Nesvan-e Vatankhah, founded 1918
Kanoun-e-Banovan, founded 1935
Mourning Mothers, mothers of children killed in violence

Iraq
Women's Awakening Club, founded 1923
General Federation of Iraqi Women, founded 1969
Iraqi Women's League, founded in the 1950s
Organization of Women's Freedom in Iraq, founded 2003
Republican Women's Organization, founded 1960

Israel
Bat Shalom, Jewish and Arab women for peace, established 1994
Coalition of Women for Peace
Haifa Women's Coalition
Israel Women's Network
Machsom Watch, controlling checkpoints
Na'amat, affiliated with the Labour Zionist Movement
Women of the Wall
Women's International Zionist Organization

Japan
Asia-Japan Women's Resource Center
Chifuren (National League of Regional Women's Organizations)
League of Women Voters of Japan, established 1945
New Japan Women's League, established 1946
New Women's Association (1920–1922)
Sekirankai, women's socialist organization

Lebanon
 Syrian-Lebanese Women's Union, founded 1920

Malaysia
All Women's Action Society
Sisters in Islam, founded 1988
Women's Aid Organisation
Asian Women's Leadership University Project

Nepal
ABC Nepal
Nepal Progressive Women's Federation
Rastriya Janashakti Mahila Sangh
Women LEAD

Myanmar
Myanmar Women's Affairs Federation
Shan Women's Action Network
Women's League of Burma, founded 1999

North Korea
Socialist Women's Union of Korea

Pakistan
All Pakistan Women's Association, founded 1949
Aurat Foundation, founded 1986
Blue Veins (Pakistan), health advocacy
Pakistan Federation of Business and Professional Women
Pakistan Foreign Office Women's Association
Revolutionary Association of the Women of Afghanistan, moved to Pakistan in early 1980s
Sindhiani Tahreek (Sindhi women's movement)
Tehrik-e-Niswan (The Woman's Movement)
Women Media Center
Women’s Action Forum, established 1981

Palestine
Arab Women's Executive Committee, founded 1929
General Union of Palestinian Women, founded 1965

Philippines
Third World Movement Against the Exploitation of Women

Qatar
Qatari Women Association

Singapore
Young Women Muslim Association of Singapore

South Korea
Chanyang-hoe, founded 1898
Korea Women's Hot Line
Korean Women's Associations United, founded 1987
Korean Women Workers Association, founded 1987
Sunseong-hoe, founded 1896
Yo-u-hoe, founded 1899

Syria
 Syrian-Lebanese Women's Union, founded 1920   
General Union of Syrian Women, founded 1967
Kongreya Star, founded 2005

Taiwan
Foundation of Women's Rights Promotion and Development
National Alliance of Taiwan Women's Associations, founded 2001

Thailand
Anjaree, gay rights
Shan Women's Action Network

United Arab Emirates
Dubai Women Establishment, established 2006

Yemen
 Adeni Women´s Club, founded in 1943
 General Union of Yemeni Women, founded in 1968
 Women National Committee, founded 1996, government body
 Yemeni Women's Union, founded in 1990

Europe
European Feminist Forum
European Women's Lobby
National Alliance of Women's Organisations
Terre des Femmes
Zonta International, founded 1919, NGO Member Council of Europe, UN Consultative status

Albania
Gruaja Shiqiptare

Austria
Allgemeiner Österreichischer Frauenverein

Azerbaijan
 Ali Bayramov Club, first women's organization in Azerbaijan, founded in 1920.

Belgium
Cercle des Femmes Peintres (1888–1893)
Ligue belge du droit des femmes, founded in 1892 in support of women's rights
Union des femmes de Wallonie, founded in 1912 for women in the French-speaking province of Wallonia

Bulgaria
Bulgarian Women's Union or Balgarski Zhenski Sayuz (1901–1944), umbrella organization

Czech Republic
Ženský Klub Český
Women's National Council

Denmark
Danish Women's Defence Association (Danske Kvinders Forsvarsforening), 1907–1921, in support of Denmark's neutrality
Danish Women's Society (Dansk Kvindesamfund), world's oldest women's rights organization, founded 1871
De Danske Husmoderforeninger (The Danish Housewives Associations)
Fødselsstiftelsen (Maternity Institution)
Kvindevalgretsforeningen (Women's Suffrage Association), women's organization (1889–1898) specifically focused on suffrage
Kvindelig Fremskridtsforening (Women's Progress Association) (1885–1893), focus on women's voting rights
Kvindelige Kunstneres Samfund (Society of Female Artists), founded 1916
Kvindelig Læseforening (Women Readers' Association), 1872–1945
Kvinderådet (The Women's Council in Denmark), Danish arm of the International Council of Women
KVINFO, The Danish Center for Research on Women and Gender
Landsforbundet for Kvinders Valgret (National Federation for Women's Right to Vote)
Lesbian Movement (Lesbisk Bevægelse), 1974–1985
Ligestillingsrådet, The Danish Equal Opportunities Council, 1975–2000
Red Stocking Movement (Rødstrømpebevægelsen) 1970–1985, left-wing women's rights movement

Estonia
Tartu Eesti Naesterahva Selts, founded 1907

Finland
Naisasialiitto Unioni, founded 1892, Finnish arm of the International Alliance of Women
Women's Bank, supporting women's businesses in developing countries

France
Association femmes et mathématiques, founded 1987
British and Commonwealth Women's Association, founded 1962
Fédération Française des Sociétés Féministes (1891–1893)
French Union for Women's Suffrage (1909–1944)
Gouines rouges, feminist lesbian movement
Groupe Feministe Socialiste, founded 1899
Kering Foundation
Ligue Française pour le Droit des Femmes 
National Council of French Women, founded 1901
Ni Putes Ni Soumises
Union des femmes pour la défense de Paris et les soins aux blessés, 1871, during the Paris Commune
Women's Grand Lodge Of France

Georgia
Taso Foundation, National Women's Fund and Memory Research Center

Germany

Bund Deutscher Frauenvereine (Federation of German Women's Associations) (1894–1933)
Democratic Women's League of Germany, founded 1947
Deutscher Verband für Frauenstimmrecht, suffrage organisation (1902–1919)
Deutscher Frauenring
Deutsches Frauenwerk, Nazi association
German Association of Female Citizens, founded 1865
League of German Girls (1930–1945), Nazi association
League of Jewish Women (Germany) (Jüdischer Frauenbund), founded 1904
National Socialist Women's League (1931–1945)
Queen Louise League or Königin-Luise-Bund, founded 1923, pro-monarchic
Terre des Femmes, founded 1981

Greece
Greek League for Women's Rights, founded 1920

Hungary
Christian Women's League
Feminist Association (1904–1942), fought for women's equality in all areas
Sisters of Social Service

Iceland
Icelandic Women's Rights Association, founded 2007

Ireland
Cumann na mBan (Irish Women's Council), founded 1913
Cumann na Saoirse
Dublin Women's Suffrage Association fought for women's suffrage
Inghinidhe na hÉireann (1900–1914), daughters of Ireland 
Irish Catholic Women's Suffrage Association, set up in Dublin in November 1915
Irish Countrywomen's Association
Irish Housewives Association (1942–1992)
Irish Women's Franchise League, women's suffrage group founded in 1908
Irish Women's Liberation Movement
Irish Women's Suffrage Society
Irish Women Workers' Union (1911–1984)
National Women's Council of Ireland

Italy
Associazione per la donna (Association for Women), founded in 1896 in support of women's civic and political rights
Comitato pro suffragio femminile (Committee for Women's Suffrage), founded in 1905 in support of women's voting rights
Consiglio Nazionale delle Donne Italiane (National Council of Italian Women), a federation founded in 1903 to improve conditions for women

Netherlands
Arbeid Adelt, meaning Labour is Ennobling, full name Algemeen Nederlandsche Vrouwenvereeniging Arbeid Adelt (1871–1953)
Dutch Women's Council, founded 1898
Mama Cash founded 1983, funding organization
Vereeniging voor Vrouwenkiesrecht (Women's Suffrage Organization), established 1894
Vrije Vrouwen Vereeniging (Free Women's Organization), established 1889

Norway
Forum for Women and Development (FOKUS), established 1995
Kvinnestemmerettsforeningen
MiRA Resource Centre for Black, Immigrant and Refugee Women, established 1989
National Association for Women's Suffrage (Norway)
Norwegian Association for Women's Rights
Norwegian Conservative Party's Women's Association, founded 1925
Norwegian Labour Party's Women's Federation, 1901–2005
Norwegian National Women's Council, founded 1904
Norwegian Women's Lobby, established 2014
Norwegian Women's Public Health Association
Nordic Women's University, established 2011
Women's Front (Kvinnefronten), established 1972

Poland
Centrum Praw Kobiet, founded 1995, women's rights and prevention of violence against women
Ukrainian Women's Union (1920–1938), nationalist and feminist organization representing non-Soviet Ukrainian women

Portugal 

Capazes, founded in 2014
Conselho Nacional das Mulheres Portuguesas, founded in 1914
UMAR (Alternative and Answer Women's Union), founded in 1976

Romania
Liga Femeilor Române, founded 1894
Liga Drepturile si Datoriile Femeii, founded 1911
Women in Business Romania, founded 2009

Russia
Communist Women's International, founded 1920, advancing Communist ideas among women

Slovenia
Splošno slovensko žensko društvo, founded 1901

Spain
Asociación Nacional de Mujeres Españolas (1918–1936)
Asociación para la Enseñanza de la Mujer, established 1870
Sección Femenina (1934–1977), women's branch of the Falange movement

Sweden
Christian Democratic Women's League
Fredrika Bremer Association, active from 1884
Group 8, active from 1968 to 2004
Married Woman's Property Rights Association, active from 1873 to 1896
Moderate Women, established 1912, representing the Moderate Party
National Association for Women's Suffrage active from 1902 to 1921
National Council of Swedish Women, founded 1896
Nya Idun, founded 1885
SD Women, representing Sweden Democrats
Social Democratic Women in Sweden, established 1920
Stockholms allmänna kvinnoklubb (Stockholm Public Women's Club), founded 1892
Swedish Women's Educational Association, promoting Swedish language and culture internationally
Swedish Women's Lobby, established 1997
Välgörande fruntimmerssällskapet, active from 1819 to 1934

Switzerland
Federation of Swiss Women's Associations
PeaceWomen Across the Globe, founded 2003

Turkey

 Osmanlı Műdafaa-ı Hukûk-ı Nisvan Cemiyeti  – founded 1913
 Türk Kadinlar Birligi – founded 1924
Flying Broom – founded 1996
Ka-Mer – founded 1997, offers protection and legal aid

Ukraine
Ukrainian Women's Union, (1920–1938), active outside Soviet Ukraine 

Feminist Workshop, Lviv, founded 2014

United Kingdom
Back Off Scotland, anti-harassment group
Birds Eye View, film
Brighton Women's Centre, safe, women-only space
British Federation of Women Graduates
British Women's Temperance Association
Church League for Women's Suffrage, founded 1909
Conservative Women's Organisation, the organisation for women members of the Conservative Party (UK)
Co-operative Women's Guild, founded 1893
Fair Play For Women
Freedom Charity, organisation for helping victims of forced marriage and associated violence
Engender, Edinburgh-based feminist organization
Feminists Against Censorship, established 1989
HeForShe
Junior League
Ladies Circle
Ladies National Association for the Repeal of the Contagious Diseases Acts, founded 1869
League of Jewish Women
Married Women's Association, established 1938
Medical Women's Federation, established 1917
Merched y Wawr, established 1967
Mothers' Union, founded 1876
National Assembly of Women, founded 1952, women's rights
National Society for Women's Suffrage, founded 1867
National Union of Women's Suffrage Societies, major woman's suffrage group
National Women's Register (NWR), network of local groups and individual members who enjoy lively discussion and conversation
Open Door Council, founded 1926, equal opportunities
Organisation of Women of African and Asian Descent
People's Suffrage Federation 
Rape Crisis England and Wales, feminist charity and umbrella body for Rape Crisis Centres across England and Wales
Royal College of Midwives, founded 1881
Socialist Women's Network
Society for Promoting the Employment of Women, established 1859
Society of Women Artists, founded c. 1855
Society of Women Musicians, founded 1911
The Association of Loyal Orangewomen of Ireland
Women in Data, founded 2014
Women in Publishing, founded 1979
Women's Engineering Society, founded 1919
Women's Guild of Arts, founded 1907
Women's Institutes (WI), 6,500 local organisations, founded 1915
Women's Labour League, founded 1906, promoting political representation
Women's Liberal Federation, Liberal Party
Women's Local Government Society, founded 1888
Women's Social and Political Union (1903–1917), a major suffrage organization in the United Kingdom

Yugoslavia
Yugoslav Women's Alliance, founded in 1919

North America
North American Indian Women's Association, founded 1970
White Buffalo Cow Society, for the Mandan and Hidatsa peoples
Women of All Red Nations, in support of Native American women

Belize
Women's Issues Network of Belize, established 1993

Canada
Calgary Women's Emergency Shelter
Canadian Advisory Council on the Status of Women
Canadian Association of Elizabeth Fry Societies
Canadian Federation of University Women
Canadian Research Institute for the Advancement of Women
 Canadian Unitarian Universalist Women's Association
Canadian Women in Literary Arts (CWILA)
Canadian Women's Foundation
Canadian Women's Press Club, founded 1904
 Canadian Women's Suffrage Association
Canadian Women Voters Congress
Congress of Black Women of Canada
DisAbled Women's Network Canada
Dominion Women's Enfranchisement Association, established 1889
Equal Voice, founded 2001
Federated Women's Institutes of Canada
Federated Women's Institutes of Ontario
Fédération des femmes du Québec, founded 1966
Imperial Order Daughters of the Empire
Junior League
Lesbian Organization of Toronto
Local Council of Women of Halifax
National Action Committee on the Status of Women, founded 1971
National Council of Women of Canada
National Organization of Immigrant and Visible Minority Women of Canada
Native Women's Association of Canada
Nova Scotia Voice of Women
Ottawa Rape Crisis Centre
Ottawa Women's Training and Employment Network
Pauktuutit, Inuit women
REAL Women of Canada
 Servants Anonymous Society
University Women's Club of Toronto
Vancouver Rape Relief & Women's Shelter, established 1973
Women's Legal Education and Action Fund, founded 1985

Cuba
Federation of Cuban Women, established 1960
Ladies in White, relatives of jailed dissidents, founded 2003

Nicaragua
Luisa Amanda Espinoza Association of Nicaraguan Women, founded 1977

United States
African-American Women for Reproductive Freedom, founded 1990
Alpha Kappa Alpha sorority, founded 1908
American Association for Women Radiologists
American Association of University Women (1881)
American Equal Rights Association
American Heritage Girls
American Legion Auxiliary, founded 1919
American Woman Suffrage Association
Alabama's Colored Women's Club, covering clubs from 1888
Assata's Daughters, founded Chicago 2015, protesting police violence
Association of Black Women Historians, founded 1979
Association of Deans of Women and Advisers to Girls in Negro Schools, 1929–1954
Association for Women in Communications
Association for Women in Science (AWIS)
Big Sisters
Business and Professional Women's Foundation
Catholic Daughters of the Americas, founded 1903
Chicago Abortion Fund, founded 1985
Collegium of Black Women Philosophers, founded 2007
Combahee River Collective, 1974–1980, Black feminist lesbian organization
Commercial Real Estate Women
Concerned Women for America
Daughters of the American Revolution, historical society, founded 1890
Daughters of Utah Pioneers, historical society, founded 1919
Delta Delta Delta, sorority, founded 1888
Degree of Pocahontas
Delta Sigma Theta sorority, founded 1913
EMILY's List
Equal Rights Advocates
Feminists for Life
Feminist Majority Foundation
General Federation of Women's Clubs (1890)
Girls on the Run, founded 1996 for pre-teens
 Girl Scouts of the United States of America
 Girls Who Code
Hadassah
Independent Women's Forum
Kappa Alpha Theta, sorority, founded 1870
JC's Girls
Job's Daughters International
Junior League
La Leche League
Ladies of Liberty Alliance, founded 2009
Lambda Tau Omega, founded 1988
League of Women Voters
Leather & Lace Motorcycle Club, founded in Florida, 1983
Mothers of the Movement, mothers of African American children
Motor Maids, motorcycle club, founded 1940
National American Woman Suffrage Association
National Association for Women in Education
National Association of Colored Women's Clubs, founded 1896
National Association of Professional Women
National Black Feminist Organization, founded 1973
National Coalition of 100 Black Women, founded 1970 in New York City
National Council of Jewish Women
National Council of Negro Women
National Council of Women of the United States, founded in 1888, affiliated with the International Council of Women
National Federation of Republican Women
National Organization for Women (NOW)
National Organization of Black Women in Law Enforcement, founded 1985
National Panhellenic Conference, women's sororities, established 1902
National Woman Suffrage Association
National Woman's Party, suffrage organization founded in 1913 by Alice Paul
National Women's Political Caucus, pro-choice organization founded in 1972
New York Women's Agenda, umbrella group
Ormes Society, promoting black women in the comic book industry
Pythian Sisters
Rebekah Degree
Red Hat Society
Relief Society, founded 1842
Royal Neighbors of America
Salsa Soul Sisters, black lesbian organization
Sigma Gamma Rho sorority, founded 1922
Sisters in Crime, established 1986 for female crime authors
Society of Women Engineers, founded 1950
Spinsters of San Francisco, founded 1929 
Sweet Adelines International, founded in 1945
Texas Federation of Women's Clubs, founded 1897
United Daughters of the Confederacy, national association of female descendants of Confederate war veterans formed in September 1894
U.S. Women's Chamber of Commerce
Veteran Feminists of America
Women Creating Change, founded 1915
Women's Caucus for Art, founded 1972
Woman's Christian Temperance Union, officially founded 1874
Women Employed, founded 1973, based in Chicago
Woman's Foreign Missionary Society, founded 1869, attached to the Methodist Episcopal Church
Women's Institute for Science, Equity and Race (WISER), founded 2016
Women's Loyal National League, 1863–1864, organized to abolish slavery, first national women's political organization in the United States
Women's Missionary and Service Commission, name established 1955, attached to the Mennonite Church
Woman's Missionary Union
Women's Political Council, formed 1946, active in the 1950s
Women's Refugee Commission
Women's Trade Union League, 1903–1950, encouraging women to organize trade unions
Younger Women's Task Force
Zeta Phi Beta sorority, founded 1920
Zonta International Empowering women through Service and Advocacy, founded 1919

Oceania

Australia
 Adelaide Women's Club (1922–1938)
Australian Federation of University Women, founded 1922
Australian Women Chamber of Commerce & Industry
 Australian Women's Health Network health advocacy organisation
 Country Women's Association, founded 1922
 Emily's List (Australian Labor Party organisation for the equalising of women in politics, started by Joan Kirner)
League of Women Voters of South Australia (1909–1979)
Lyceum Club (Australia), founded 1972
Melbourne Society of Women Painters and Sculptors, founded 1902
 National Council of Women of Australia, founded 1888, affiliated with the International Council of Women
National Council of Women of Queensland, founded 1905
Union of Australian Women (1950–1995)
 Women's Electoral Lobby, founded 1972
Women's National Emergency Legion (1938–1947)
Women's Peace Army, founded 1915
Women's Service Guilds (1909–1997)

New Zealand
Māori Women's Welfare League
National Council of Women of New Zealand
New Zealand Prostitutes' Collective

Solomon Islands
Solomon Islands National Council of Women, founded 1983
Women’s Rights Action Movement

South America

Argentina
Associación Madres del Dolor (Mothers in Pain), established 2004
Foundation for Studies and Research on Women (FEIM), established 1989.
Grandmothers of the Plaza de Mayo, established 1977. An organization of women whose grandchildren "disappeared".
Mothers of the Plaza 25 de Mayo. An organization of mothers whose children "disappeared" in the Santa Fe Province.
Mothers of the Plaza de Mayo, established 1977. An organization of mothers whose children "disappeared".
Ni una menos (Not one [woman] less), established 2015. Against machista violence.

Bolivia
Atene Femenino, founded 1923. White upper-class women's organization working for women's rights.
Bartolina Sisa Confederation, founded 1980. Union for peasant women in Bolivia.
Mujeres Creando, founded 1992. Anarcha-feminist collective.

Brazil 

Brazilian Women's Articulation (AMB – Articulação de Mulheres Brasileiras), founded 1994. Links women's organizations across Brazil.
Brazilian Women's Federation, active 1949 to 1957. Leftist feminist group associated with the Brazilian Communist Party (PCB).
Federação Brasileira pelo Progresso Feminino (FBPF), founded 1922. Women's suffrage organization.
Geledés - Black Women's Institute, founded 1988. Black feminist NGO.

Chile
Círculo de Estudios de la Mujer, active 1979 to 1983. Response to the Pinochet dictatorship.
National Council of Women (Chile), founded in 1919. Women's suffrage organization.
Pro-Emancipation Movement of Chilean Women, active 1935 to 1953. Women's organization with national political strategy. Restarted in 1983 as an umbrella organization of women's groups.

Colombia
Butterflies with New Wings Building a Future (Butterflies), founded 2010. Self-help group of forcibly displaced and local women in Buenaventura, Valle del Cauca.
WWB Colombia, founded 1980. Microfinance institution.

Mexico
Coalition of Mexican Feminist Women, active 1976 to early 1980s. Feminist organization focussing on abortion rights.

Paraguay
Coordinación de Mujeres del Paraguay, founded 1987. National network of feminist organizations.
Liga Paraguaya de los Derechos de la Mujer, founded 1951. 
Unión Femenina del Paraguay (UFP), active 1936 to 1937
Unión Democrática de Mujeres, active 1946 to 1947.

Peru
Accion para la Liberacion de la Mujer Peruana (ALIMUPER), active 1973 to the early 1980s. Middle-class feminist organization.
Flora Tristán Peruvian Women's Center, founded 1979. Middle-class feminist organization.

Uruguay
Consejo Nacional de Mujeres del Uruguay (CONAMU), founded 1916. Organization pressing for women's suffrage and other women's issues.
Cotidiano Mujer, founded 1985. Feminist collective based in Montevideo.
Independent Democratic Feminist Party, active 1933 to 1938. Feminist political party founded by Sara Rey Álvarez.
Uruguayan Women's Suffrage Alliance. Founded 1919. Women's suffrage organization.

See also

 List of women's associations
 List of women's conferences
 List of human rights organizations
 List of organizations for women in science
 List of women's rights activists
 List of women pacifists and peace activists
 Women's suffrage organizations
 Women's rights

References

Lists of organizations

Human rights-related lists
Organizations